Let This Melody Ring On is an album by saxophonist Carlos Garnett which was recorded in 1975 and released on the Muse label.

Track listing
All compositions by Carlos Garnett except where notd
 "Good Shepherd" – 4:30
 "Panama Roots" – 9:30
 "Ghetto Jungle" (Garett, Carlos Chambers) – 5:20
 "Señor Trane" – 7:35
 "Samba Serendade" – 6:33
 "Let This Melody Ring On" – 6:44

Personnel
Carlos Garnett – tenor saxophone, baritone saxophone, ukulele, vocals
Olu Dara – trumpet
Kiane Zawadi − trombone, euphonium
Reggie Lucas – guitar 
Carlos Chambers, Carlos Jordan – ukulele (track 3)
Hubert Eaves – keyboards 
Anthony Jackson – electric bass guitar, contra bass guitar 
James (Fish) Benjamin – bass (tracks 1 & 4)
Howard King – drums
Neil Clarke − percussion
Charles Dalton, Diedre Murray, Howard Hall, Joe Singer, John Blake, Richard Locker – strings
Prema – vocals

References

Muse Records albums
Carlos Garnett albums
1975 albums